Bon Zard (also known as; also known as Bamzar, Bem Zard, Bom Zard, and Bonah Zard) is a village in Kuh Mareh Sorkhi Rural District, Arzhan District, Shiraz County, Fars Province, Iran. At the 2006 census, its population was 134, in 27 families.

References 

Populated places in Shiraz County